Macra Come or Makra Kome was a fortress mentioned by Livy along with Sperchiae in Ainis, in ancient Thessaly. It may have been a town of the Aenianes.

Its site is at a place called Varybopi in modern-day Makrakomi.

References

Populated places in ancient Thessaly
Former populated places in Greece
Ainis